Yohn Géiller Mosquera Martínez, better known as Yohn Mosquera (born April 15, 1989), is a Colombian footballer who plays as a defensive midfielder for Real Estelí FC of the Liga Primera de Nicaragua.

Career
Born in Turbo city, Yohn Geiller Mosquera started his professional career in 2009, playing for Medellín. He played six Colombian First Division games for the club without scoring a goal. He was transferred to Série A club Bahia of Brazil on February 20, 2011.

References

1991 births
Living people
Colombian footballers
Colombian expatriate footballers
Independiente Medellín footballers
Esporte Clube Bahia players
Águilas Doradas Rionegro players
Real Cartagena footballers
Cortuluá footballers
Jaguares de Córdoba footballers
Real Estelí F.C. players
Categoría Primera A players
Categoría Primera B players
Association football midfielders
Colombian expatriate sportspeople in Brazil
Colombian expatriate sportspeople in Nicaragua
Expatriate footballers in Brazil
Expatriate footballers in Nicaragua
Sportspeople from Antioquia Department